Marshal-Admiral Viscount  was a career officer in the Imperial Japanese Navy, cabinet minister, and Prime Minister of Japan from 1922 to 1923.

Biography

Born in Hiroshima, Aki Province (modern Hiroshima Prefecture) to a samurai family, Katō enrolled in the 7th class Imperial Japanese Naval Academy and graduated second out of a class of 30 cadets. He specialized in both naval artillery and in navigation.

Naval career

After his commissioning as lieutenant, Katō served on the corvette  in 1887, followed by the cruiser . During the First Sino-Japanese War, he served in a combat position as gunnery officer on the cruiser . After the end of the war, he served in numerous staff positions before promotion to commander. He was promoted to rear admiral on 1 September 1904.

During the Russo-Japanese War, Katō served as chief of staff to Admiral Tōgō Heihachirō on the battleship , assisting in Japan's victory at the Battle of Tsushima. During this time, he suffered from a very weak stomach, and was vomiting as he issued orders throughout the battle, despite having taken large amounts of medication.

Katō became Vice Minister of the Navy in 1906, and was promoted to vice admiral on 28 August 1908. In 1909, he was appointed commander of the Kure Naval District, and in 1913 became Commander in Chief of the Combined Fleet.

Katō became Minister of the Navy in August 1915, days before his promotion to full admiral on 28 August 1915. He served in this post in the cabinets of Ōkuma Shigenobu, Terauchi Masatake, Hara Takashi, and Takahashi Korekiyo. Under Hara and Takahashi, Katō was Japan's chief commissioner plenipotentiary to the Washington Naval Conference, and worked with Ambassador Shidehara Kijurō in the negotiations that led to the Five-Power Treaty.

As Prime Minister
Following his return to Japan, Katō was appointed 21st Prime Minister of Japan in recognition of his performance at the Washington Naval Conference. His cabinet consisted mainly of bureaucrats and members of the House of Peers, which proved unpopular with the Imperial Japanese Army. During his tenure as prime minister, Katō implemented the provisions of the Washington Naval Agreement, withdrew Japanese forces from Shantung in China and ended Japanese participation in the Siberian Intervention. Katō succumbed to late-stage colon cancer and died a little over a year into his term.

Katō was given the honorary rank of Marshal Admiral the day before his death, and posthumously awarded the Grand Cordon of the Supreme Order of the Chrysanthemum and his title raised to shishaku (viscount).

His death came only a week before the Great Kantō earthquake of 1923, and therefore Japan was without a prime minister during that disaster.

Katō's grave is at Aoyama Cemetery, Tokyo.

Honors
From the corresponding article in the Japanese Wikipedia

Order of the Golden Kite, 2nd class (1 April 1906; Fifth Class: 27 September 1895)
Grand Cordon of the Order of the Sacred Treasure (28 November 1913; Second Class: 30 November 1905; Fifth Class: 9 May 1899; Sixth Class: 24 November 1894)
Grand Cordon of the Order of the Rising Sun (14 July 1916; Second Class: 1 April 1906; Sixth Class: 27 September 1895)
Baron (7 September 1920)
Grand Cordon of the Order of the Paulownia Flowers (7 September 1920)
Grand Cordon of the Order of the Chrysanthemum (24 August 1923; posthumous)
Viscount (24 August 1923; posthumous)

References

Books

External links

Notes 

|-

|-

1861 births
1923 deaths
20th-century prime ministers of Japan
People from Hiroshima
Deaths from cancer in Japan
Deaths from colorectal cancer
Imperial Japanese Navy marshal admirals
Ministers of the Imperial Japanese Navy
Kazoku
People of Meiji-period Japan
Japanese military personnel of the First Sino-Japanese War
Japanese military personnel of the Russo-Japanese War
Prime Ministers of Japan
Recipients of the Order of the Golden Kite
Recipients of the Order of the Rising Sun
Recipients of the Order of the Sacred Treasure
Military personnel from Hiroshima
Imperial Japanese Naval Academy alumni